Katrina Devine (born 21 April 1980) is an Irish-born New Zealand actress.

Biography
Devine migrated to New Zealand with her family when she was six years old and competed in Irish dance during her teens. In 1994, Katrina earned a role on Shortland Street, which she appeared in for eight years playing receptionist Minnie Crozier. In 1998, she won the best supporting actress award at the New Zealand Television Awards for her work on the show.

Later, in 2001, Devine married former Shortland Street co-star Blair Strang; the couple later divorced. In 2003, Katrina played the villainous Marah on Power Rangers Ninja Storm, and later returned to play the recurring role of Cassidy on Power Rangers Dino Thunder in 2004.

Devine has sung in several musical productions and was an editor of the New Zealand teen magazine Creme.

Filmography

References

External links

1980 births
Living people
New Zealand television actresses
Irish actresses
New Zealand people of Irish descent
Actresses from Northern Ireland
New Zealand soap opera actresses
20th-century New Zealand actresses
21st-century New Zealand actresses